Mama's Boy is an American sitcom television series that aired from September 19, 1987 until August 6, 1988. It was created by Susan Harris, and produced by Witt/Thomas/Harris Productions and it was distributed by TeleVentures. The comedy starred Bruce Weitz and Nancy Walker in the lead roles.

Mama's Boy was proposed as a new NBC project to debut as a series sometime during the 1987–88 season. When it debuted, it was described as a "designated hitter" -- "a show that will be broadcast monthly and then, ratings permitting, be ready to move into a weekly slot if required." However, after a couple of telecasts in the fall of 1987, the network continued to air the series' initial episodes sporadically (with as many as five months passing between episodes three and four) without a regular time slot. By the end of the season, NBC decided not to upgrade the show from "specials" status; only seven episodes were produced, with six airing through August 6, 1988. The last episode remains unaired.

Premise
A newspaper columnist shares a New York apartment with his mother.

Weitz and Walker received this series in response to their recent popular NBC roles: his seven-year run as Det. Mick Belker on Hill Street Blues, and her two-time guest role as Angela, sister of Sophia Petrillo (Estelle Getty) on The Golden Girls. Additionally, Dan Hedaya, whose high-profile NBC guest role was as Nick Tortelli on Cheers, was added to the cast of this proposed series soon after the cancellation of his short-lived Cheers spin-off, The Tortellis.

Cast
Bruce Weitz as Jake McCaskey
Nancy Walker as Molly McCaskey
Susan Blakely as Victoria
Dan Hedaya as Mickey

Episodes

References

External links

1987 American television series debuts
1988 American television series endings
1980s American sitcoms
English-language television shows
NBC original programming
Television series by Sony Pictures Television
Television shows set in New York City